The Marriott Mena House Hotel is a hotel located just outside Cairo, Egypt, owned by the Egyptian General Company For Tourism & Hotels (EGOTH). It was built on the site of an 1869 hunting lodge, and in 1890 opened Egypt's first swimming pool.

History

The Mena House was initially a hunting lodge; it was a two-story hut nicknamed the "Mud Hut". It was built in 1869 for the Egyptian Khedive Isma'il Pasha. 

Due to political matters in 1883, Isma'il sold the lodge to Frederick and Jessie Head as a private residence. The couple came across the building while on their honeymoon and once it was purchased they expanded it. In 1885, it was then sold to an English couple, Ethel and Hugh F. Locke King. They immediately began construction on the hotel and opened it to the public in 1886 as The Mena House. The hotel is named after the founding father of the first Egyptian dynasty, Mena or King Menes. 

In 1890, the hotel opened Egypt’s first swimming pool and in that same year it was announced that the hotel would remain open year round. During World War I the hotel was requisitioned by Australian troops and occupied again by the Australians in 1939. Toward the end of the war it was then converted to a hospital for wounded Australian troops. 

The Oberoi Group took over management of the hotel in 1972. In December 1977, Egypt and Israel sat down together at Mena House in a quest for a peace settlement (also attending were American and United Nations representatives). The results of this Mena House Conference were to lead to the Camp David Agreement, which restored Egypt's sovereignty over the Sinai peninsula.

Renovations and expansions

In 1920, 30 more rooms were added. In 1972, the Oberoi Group began managing the hotel, beginning with a refurbishment; it was completed in 1975. The hotel was renamed The Mena House Oberoi. In 1978, they began construction on the garden wing, which was opened by the general manager Kaval Nain Oberoi, a relative of the owner; 200 rooms were added. In 2007 and 2008 the hotel was renovated again. The term of the Management Agreement between The Oberoi Group and EGOTH, the owner of Mena House Oberoi, expired on 31 December 2012. The Oberoi Group ceased managing the Mena House on 1 January 2013 and it was renamed Mena House Hotel, with the Egyptian General Company For Tourism & Hotels operating the hotel. On 31 March 2015, it was announced that Marriott International would assume management of the hotel. The garden wing was renamed Marriott Mena House Cairo on 1 February 2018. The historic Palace wing has been closed for extensive renovations and will join Marriott's JW Marriott luxury division as JW Marriott Cairo Mena House in late 2021.

Famous visitors
In 1889, Prince Albert Victor of Wales stayed at the hotel. In 1894, Sir Arthur Conan Doyle and his wife stayed there. In 1909, the future King George V and Queen Mary attended a banquet there. Circa 1914, Winston Churchill stayed at the hotel. In 1939, King Farouk of Egypt frequently visited. In 1974, President Richard Nixon visited. Many members of state have also stayed there including; King Gustav of Sweden, King Umberto of Italy, Emperor of Ethiopia Haile Selassie and the English military commander Field Marshal Montgomery. The wing where Montgomery stayed still carries his name. Other notable people such as Agatha Christie, Roger Moore, Cecil B. DeMille, Charlton Heston, Frank Sinatra, David Lean, Evelyn Waugh and Charlie Chaplin have all stayed at Mena House Oberoi.

See also 
 Sofitel Winter Palace Hotel

References

External links
 Marriott Mena House - official website
 Mena House research page - by Andreas Augustin / famoushotels

Hotels in Cairo
Hotels established in 1886
1886 establishments in Egypt
Marriott hotels